The following are the national records in athletics in Serbia maintained by its national athletics federation: Srpski Atletski Savez (SAS).

Outdoor

Key to tables:

+ = en route to a longer distance

h = hand timing

A = affected by altitude

dh = downhill

Men

Women

Indoor

Men

Women

Notes

See also
List of Serbian records in swimming

References
General
Serbian Outdoor records Updated as of October 2022
Serbian Indoor records Updated as of October 2022
Specific

External links
SAS web site
Serbian records page

National records in athletics (track and field)
Athletics
Athletics records